The China national under-17 football team, also known as the China Junior Team (国少队), represents the People's Republic of China in international football competitions in the FIFA U-17 World Cup and the AFC U-16 Championship, as well as any other under-17 international football tournaments. It is governed by the Football Association of the People's Republic of China.

Tournament records

AFC U-16 Championship record

FIFA U-17 World Cup record

* Denotes draws include knockout matches decided on penalty kicks.

Recent Matches

2017

U-15

U-16

2018

U-17

Squad

Current coaches

Current squad

References

External links
 Chinese Football Association Official Website 
 Team China Official Website 
 Profile on FIFA
 Profile on AFC

Under-17
Asian national under-17 association football teams